eBird is an online database of bird observations providing scientists, researchers and amateur naturalists with real-time data about bird distribution and abundance. Originally restricted to sightings from the Western Hemisphere, the project expanded to include New Zealand in 2008, and again expanded to cover the whole world in June 2010. eBird has been described as an ambitious example of enlisting amateurs to gather data on biodiversity for use in science.

eBird is an example of crowdsourcing, and has been hailed as an example of democratizing science, treating citizens as scientists, allowing the public to access and use their own data and the collective data generated by others.

History and purpose
Launched in 2002 by the Cornell Lab of Ornithology at Cornell University and the National Audubon Society, eBird gathers basic data on bird abundance and distribution at a variety of spatial and temporal scales. It was mainly inspired by the ÉPOQ database, created by Jacques Larivée in 1975. As of May 12, 2021, there were over one billion bird observations recorded through this global database. In recent years, there have been over 100 million bird observations recorded each year.

eBird's goal is to maximize the utility and accessibility of the vast numbers of bird observations made each year by recreational and professional birders. The observations of each participant join those of others in an international network. Due to the variability in the observations the volunteers make, AI filters observations through collected historical data to improve accuracy. The data are then available via internet queries in a variety of formats.

Use of Database Information

The eBird Database has been used by scientists to determine the connection between bird migrations and monsoon rains in India validating traditional knowledge. It has also been used to notice bird distribution changes due to climate change and help to define migration routes. A study conducted found that eBird lists were accurate at determining population trends and distribution if there were 10,000 checklists for a given area.

Features
eBird documents the presence or absence of species, as well as bird abundance through checklist data. A web interface allows participants to submit their observations or view results via interactive queries of the database. Internet tools maintain personal bird records and enable users to visualize data with interactive maps, graphs, and bar charts. As of 2022, the eBird website is fully available in 14 languages (with different dialect options for three of them) and eBird supports common names for birds in 55 languages with 39 regional versions, for a total of 95 regional sets of common names.

eBird is a free service. Data are stored in a secure facility and archived daily, and are accessible to anyone via the eBird web site and other applications developed by the global biodiversity information community. For example, eBird data are part of the Avian Knowledge Network (AKN), which integrates observational data on bird populations across the western hemisphere and is a data source for the digital ornithological reference Birds of North America. In turn, the AKN feeds eBird data to international biodiversity data systems, such as the Global Biodiversity Information Facility.

Electronic kiosks
In addition to accepting records submitted from users' personal computers and mobile devices, eBird has placed electronic kiosks in prime birding locations, including one in the education center at the J. N. "Ding" Darling National Wildlife Refuge on Sanibel Island in Florida.

Integration in cars
eBird is a part of Starlink on the 2019 Subaru Ascent. It allows eBird to be integrated into the touch screen of the car.

Extent of information

Bird checklists 
eBird collects information worldwide, but the vast majority of checklists are submitted from North America. The numbers of checklists listed in the table below include only complete checklists, where observers report all of the species that they can identify throughout the duration of the checklist.

Regional portals 
eBird involves a number of regional portals for different parts of the world, managed by local partners. These portals include the following, separated by region.

United States 

 Alaska eBird
 Arkansas eBird
 eBird Northwest
 Mass Audubon eBird
 Maine eBird
 eBird Missouri
 NJ Audubon eBird
 New Hampshire eBird
 Minnesota eBird
 Montana eBird
 Pennsylvania eBird
 Texas eBird
 Virginia eBird
 Vermont eBird
 Wisconsin eBird

Canada 

 eBird Canada
 eBird Québec

Caribbean 

 eBird Caribbean
 eBird Puerto Rico

Mexico 

 eBird Mexico (aVerAves)

Central America 

 eBird Central America

South America 

 eBird Argentina
 eBird Brasil
 eBird Chile
 eBird Colombia
 eBird Paraguay
 eBird Peru

Europe 

 eBird España
 PortugalAves
 eKuşbank (eBird Turkey)

Africa 

 eBird Rwanda
 eBird Zambia

Asia 

 eBird India
 eBird Israel
 eBird Japan
 eBird Malaysia
 eBird Singapore
 eBird Taiwan

Australia and New Zealand 

 eBird Australia
 New Zealand eBird

Notes

References

External links

eBird website
List of publications using eBird data

2002 introductions
Biodiversity databases
Birdwatching
Citizen science
Cornell University
Ornithological citizen science